The Asa (Asa) is a river of Kazakhstan.

Course
The river has its source in the Karatau Mountains.
It flows through lakes Bilikol and Akkol.
Further downstream it vanishes in the Muyunkum Desert before reaching the river Talas.

References

Rivers of Kazakhstan